Jorge Avila-Torrez (born August 18, 1988) is an American serial killer and rapist, known for a double murder of two girls in his hometown of Zion, Illinois. He was later connected to the crime via DNA evidence after having already been convicted of a slaying at Joint Base Myer–Henderson Hall, as well as other sexually-motivated crimes.

Hobbs/Tobias murders
Eight-year-old Laura Hobbs and nine-year-old Krystal Tobias went out to play on their bicycles but failed to return by nightfall on Mother's Day in May 2005. Their families, police, and volunteers searched for the girls all night, but to no avail. The girls bodies were found the following day by Hobbs's father, Jerry. Both girls had suffered fatal stab wounds to their necks and faces. In addition, they were sexually assaulted.

Authorities immediately focused on Jerry Hobbs, as he was an ex-convict. Hobbs had moved to the city in the summer of 2005 from Texas to reconcile with his girlfriend and three children following an incident where he chased off a man with a chainsaw. Police arrested him for possession of a knife, and after a lengthy interrogation, he confessed to the murders. 

Hobbs spent the following five years in a Lake County jail awaiting trial, despite his defense team and a private laboratory finding that semen samples taken from Laura's body did not match Jerry in 2008. 

Then 16-year-old Jorge Avila-Torrez lived in the neighborhood and was acquainted with the girls, as he was friends with Krystal's older half-brother.

Virginia crimes

Murder of Amanda Snell
Not long after the double murder, Avila-Torrez joined the Marines. He was stationed at Joint Base Myer–Henderson Hall in Arlington County, Virginia. In 2009, he attacked 20-year-old Navy Petty Officer 2nd Class Amanda Jean Snell, a Naval Military Intelligence specialist, strangling her to death in the barracks area. He escaped detection for the murder until he was apprehended for later crimes.

Virginia rapes and arrest
In February 2010, Avila-Torres stalked and abducted two women in northern Virginia, binding them with electrical cords in their Ballston apartment. He kidnapped one of the women,  driving to a secluded area where he raped and strangled her before leaving her for dead at the side of the road. The woman survived and reported the crime, leading to the arrest of Avila-Torres. DNA collected and run from this case was linked to the previous murders.

Trials and imprisonment
After his arrest, Avila-Torrez was housed with 37-year-old Osama El-Atari, a former restaurateur jailed for defrauding several banks of $53 million. In exchange for a lesser sentence, El-Atari had agreed to carry a wiretap on him, and during one of their recorded conversations, he asked Jorge if he feels any remorse. In response, Avila-Torrez replied negatively and directly implicated himself in all three murders.

In his 2014 federal jury trial, backed by the jailhouse confession, El-Atari's testimony, and the DNA evidence, Avila-Torrez was sentenced to death for the Snell murder, in addition to receiving five life sentences plus 168 years in prison on the state level for his other crimes. He was the first person to receive a federal death penalty since 2007.

Following these trials, he was extradited to Lake County and held in the county jail after his initial housing in the Red Onion State Prison. 

Jerry Hobbs was officially exonerated and successfully sued various law agencies in Lake County. 

Avila-Torrez was put on trial for the murder of the two girls that same year. His defense attorney, Jed Stone, attempted to dismiss the DNA evidence as "substandard and weak," additionally pointing out that El-Atari's testimony should be discarded, as he was found murdered during an unrelated robbery in Maryland that February. Avila-Torrez pled guilty in exchange for 100 years imprisonment and a transfer from Red Onion State Prison, which Stone called "an evil, racist facility." At his sentencing, presiding Justice Daniel Shanes told Avila-Torrez that he was a serial killer, and if he had even a spark of goodness, it was so far out of his reach that it was unattainable. Currently, Jorge Avila-Torrez is detained in USP Terre Haute, awaiting execution.

See also
 List of death row inmates in the United States
 List of serial killers in the United States

References

1988 births
21st-century American criminals
American murderers of children
American people convicted of murder
American people convicted of rape
American prisoners sentenced to life imprisonment
American serial killers
Criminals from Illinois
Living people
Male serial killers
Military personnel from Illinois
People convicted of murder by Illinois
People convicted of murder by Virginia
People convicted of murder by the United States federal government
People from Zion, Illinois
Prisoners sentenced to death by the United States federal government
Prisoners sentenced to life imprisonment by Illinois
Prisoners sentenced to life imprisonment by Virginia
United States Marines